William Henry Dixon (28 May 1860 – 18 May 1935) was an Australian politician. He was born in Ouse, Tasmania. In 1919 he was elected to the Tasmanian House of Assembly as a Nationalist member for Franklin, joining the Country Party when it was formed in 1920. He was defeated in 1922. Dixon died in Sydney in 1935.

References

External links
Obituary in Burnie Advocate

1860 births
1935 deaths
Nationalist Party of Australia members of the Parliament of Tasmania
National Party of Australia members of the Parliament of Tasmania
Members of the Tasmanian House of Assembly